Silentium Amoris, the third studio album by William Control, was released on April 2, 2012 through Control Records.  It was produced and engineered by William Control, and mixed by Justin Armstrong.  Recording and mixing took place at the Control Room in January/February 2012.  A video for the only single, Kiss Me Judas, was released on YouTube, although a video was also released for The Velvet Warms And Binds.  A portion of the proceeds from the album was donated to the Ryther Treatment Center, where Francis lived for a time as a teenager.

Track listing

Trivia
 The title of track 1 is German for 'attention', while the titles of tracks 9 and 13 are Latin for 'love conquers all' and 'silence of love', respectively.  
 Achtung is actually dialogue taken from the 2000 film Quills, inspired by the life and work of the Marquis de Sade.  
 Kiss Me, Judas is the first novel in a trilogy by American author Will Christopher Baer, and the storyline for the video for I'm Only Human Sometimes from Control's previous album Noir is based on the book's plot.  
 Track 8 is a Joy Division cover.
 Track 11 is a Daniel Johnston cover.
 Track 13 is a poem by Oscar Wilde

Credits
 Photography: Lisa Johnson
 Art direction: DoubleJ - liveevildesigns.com

References

2012 albums
William Control albums
Control Records albums